The Canadian Biodiversity Information Network (CBIN)  was developed in 1996 to deliver information on the Canadian Biodiversity Strategy and to serve as Canada's national node to the global Clearing House Mechanism.  CBIN facilitates biodiversity-relevant information-sharing as part of Canada's implementation of the United Nations Convention on Biological Diversity.

See also: Criticisms of the biodiversity paradigm

References

External links
Convention on Biological Diversity
Biodiversity Convention Office
Environment Canada

Environment of Canada
Environment and Climate Change Canada